Psalm 21 is the 21st psalm of the Book of Psalms, beginning in English in the King James Version: "The king shall joy in thy strength". The Book of Psalms is part of the third section of the Hebrew Bible, and a book of the Christian Old Testament. In the slightly different numbering system used in the Greek Septuagint and Latin Vulgate translations of the Bible, this psalm is Psalm 20. In Latin, it is known by the incipit, "". The psalm is attributed to David.
 
Psalm 21 is used in both Jewish and Christian liturgies. It has often been set to music, especially for royal functions, such as Handel's Coronation anthems.

Text

Hebrew Bible version
Following is the Hebrew text of Psalm 21:

King James Version
(To the chief Musician, A Psalm of David.)
 The king shall joy in thy strength, O LORD; and in thy salvation how greatly shall he rejoice!
 Thou hast given him his heart's desire, and hast not withholden the request of his lips. Selah.
 For thou preventest him with the blessings of goodness: thou settest a crown of pure gold on his head.
 He asked life of thee, and thou gavest it him, even length of days for ever and ever.
 His glory is great in thy salvation: honour and majesty hast thou laid upon him.
 For thou hast made him most blessed for ever: thou hast made him exceeding glad with thy countenance.
 For the king trusteth in the LORD, and through the mercy of the most High he shall not be moved.
 Thine hand shall find out all thine enemies: thy right hand shall find out those that hate thee.
 Thou shalt make them as a fiery oven in the time of thine anger: the LORD shall swallow them up in his wrath, and the fire shall devour them.
 Their fruit shalt thou destroy from the earth, and their seed from among the children of men.
 For they intended evil against thee: they imagined a mischievous device, which they are not able to perform.
 Therefore shalt thou make them turn their back, when thou shalt make ready thine arrows upon thy strings against the face of them.
 Be thou exalted, LORD, in thine own strength: so will we sing and praise thy power.

Themes
This royal psalm and the previous one are closely related: they are both liturgical psalms; in both, the king is the prominent figure. Psalm 21 is characterised as a psalm of thanksgiving. It focuses on the imagery of a king; the king is often credited with being an example of the moral state of a kingdom in the Old Testament. 

Commentary by the theologian John Calvin relates this psalm to the belief that God had appointed a succession of rulers on Earth, starting with David and eventually leading to the messiah, who Calvin identified as Jesus. Calvin also implies that this psalm does not refer to a specific king, but to all kings. The Jerusalem Bible identifies both messianic and eschatological themes, and commends the application of this psalm to the idea of "Christ the King". Verse 9, the time of thine anger in the King James Version, the day that you appear in the Jerusalem Bible, and the reference to a blazing furnace "suggest a more ... eschatological perspective".

Commentator Cyril Rodd notes that "the situation to which [the psalm] refers is not clear". He identifies four possible occasions for its composition or use:
before a battle
after a victory
at the king's coronation
at an annual celebration of the king's accession.

The New Revised Standard Version specifies that it is a psalm of "thanksgiving for victory".

Uses 
In the Church of England's Book of Common Prayer, this psalm is appointed to be read on the morning of the fourth day of the month.

This psalm has been used as the name of the church ministry known as "Psalm 21 Church" or "Psalm 21 Kingdom Heritage", in Pontianak, West Kalimantan, Indonesia since 2004.

Verses 1-4 are used as the source material for the anthem "O Lord Make Thy Servant Elizabeth" by William Byrd.

Musical settings 
A setting of Psalm 21 in English, "O Lord how joyful is the king", by John Bennet was published in 1621 in The Whole Booke of Psalmes, edited by Thomas Ravenscroft. Heinrich Schütz wrote a setting of a paraphrase of the psalm in German, "Hoch freuet sich der König", SWV 118, for the Becker Psalter, published first in 1628. Marc-Antoine Charpentier set a Latin version around 1675, one Prière pour le Roi "Domine in virtute tua", H.164 for 3 voices, 2 treble instruments, and continuo. Handel used verses 1 and 3–5 in English for his Coronation anthem in three movements, The King Shall Rejoice, HWV 260, in 1727.

References

External links

 
 
  in Hebrew and English - Mechon-mamre
 Text of Psalm 21 according to the 1928 Psalter
 For the leader. A psalm of David. / LORD, the king finds joy in your power text and footnotes, usccb.org United States Conference of Catholic Bishops
 Psalm 21:1 introduction and text, biblestudytools.com
 Psalm 21 – The Joyful King enduringword.com
 Psalm 21 / Refrain: The king puts his trust in the Lord. Church of England
 Psalm 21 at biblegateway.com
 Hymns for Psalm 21 hymnary.org

021
Works attributed to David